Geoffrey Cyril Mardon (24 November 1927 – 6 August 2015) was a New Zealand speedway rider. He rode for the Aldershot Shots, the Wimbledon Dons and the Southampton Saints.

Career
Mardon began riding at the Aranui Speedway in Christchurch in 1949, the same track that would later start the career of six time World Champion and fellow Christchurch native Ivan Mauger. He moved to England in 1951 and joined the third division team, Aldershot. He qualified as second reserve for the 1951 World Final. The following year he transferred to the Wimbledon team. He rode in the 1953 World Final and finished in 3rd place. In 1954 Mardon was one of the highest individual points scorers in the National League. He rode in the World final again and he won the Brandonapolis at Coventry. Later in the year he married Valerie Moore, the sister of Ronnie Moore. At the beginning of 1955 he decided to retire and live in New Zealand. After a four-year break Southampton persuaded him to return to British speedway in 1959. He rode for the Saints for a year and qualified for the World final.

Mardon won the 1964 New Zealand Championship. He died on 6 August 2015 in Christchurch.

World final appearances
Mardon had four appearances in world championship finals:
 1951 -  London, Wembley Stadium - Reserve - Did Not Ride
 1953 -  London, Wembley Stadium - 3rd - 12pts
 1954 -  London, Wembley Stadium - 11th - 5pts
 1959 -  London, Wembley Stadium - 10th - 6pts

References 

1927 births
2015 deaths
New Zealand speedway riders
Wimbledon Dons riders
Southampton Saints riders
Aldershot Shots riders
Sportspeople from Christchurch
New Zealand expatriate sportspeople in England